The Diocese of Chalatenango is a Latin Church ecclesiastical territory or diocese of the Catholic Church in El Salvador. It is a suffragan diocese in the ecclesiastical province of the metropolitan Archdiocese of San Salvador. The Diocese of Chalatenango was erected on 30 December 1987.

Ordinaries
Eduardo Alas Alfaro (1987–2007)
Luis Morao Andreazza, O.F.M. (2007–2016)
Oswaldo Estéfano Escobar Aguilar, O.C.D. (July 14, 2016 – present); formerly, President of the Conference of Religious of El Salvador (CONFRES)

See also
Catholic Church in El Salvador
List of Roman Catholic dioceses in El Salvador

References

External links
 

Roman Catholic dioceses in El Salvador
Christian organizations established in 1987
Roman Catholic dioceses and prelatures established in the 20th century
1987 establishments in El Salvador
Roman Catholic Ecclesiastical Province of San Salvador